Sebastes  hubbsi is a species of marine ray-finned fish belonging to the subfamily Sebastinae, the rockfishes, part of the family Scorpaenidae. This species is found in the Northwest Pacific. It grows to  standard length.

Taxonomy
Sebastes hubbsi was first formally described in 1937 as Sebastichthys hubbsi by the Japanese ichthyologist Kiyomatsu Matsubara with the type locality given as Japan. Some authorities classify this species in the subgenus Pteropodus. The specific name honours the American ichthyologist Carl L. Hubbs, who pointed out that the name Matsubara originally gave this taxon in 1936, Sebastichthys brevispinis, was preoccupied by Tarleton Hoffman Bean’s S. proriger brevispinis, described in 1884.

Description

Distribution and habitat
Sebastes hubbsi is found in the northwestern Pacific Ocean off the coasts of China, Japan and Korea. It is a demersal species.

Biology
The larvae and pelagic juveniles of this species were found close to shore and not in offshore habitats. The youngest larvae fed on small zooplankton while the older larvae and juveniles fed on calanoid copepods and the eggs of invertebrates. The rapid development of the larvae prevents offshore dispersal of this species. In Jiaozhou Bay, Qingdao breeding takes place from April to May.

Culinary use
Sebastes hubbsi is known as ureok in Korean cuisine and used in fish soup.

References

External links
 
 

hubbsi
Taxa named by Kiyomatsu Matsubara
Fish described in 1937
Fish of the Pacific Ocean
Commercial fish